UNIS or Unis may refer to:

Union of Nigerien Independents and Sympathisers, a defunct political party in Niger
Unis, a new religious movement founded in the 1960s, based on the teachings of George Gurdjieff
UniS, the corporate logo of the University of Surrey from 1998 to 2007
Unis (TV channel), a Canadian French-language television channel
United Nations Information Service Vienna
United Nations International School, New York City
United Nations International School of Hanoi, located in Hanoi, Vietnam
Universal Space, a manufacturer of arcade games
Universidad del Istmo, a university in Fraijanes, Guatemala
University Centre in Svalbard, Norway
an alternate spelling of Unas, a pharaoh of ancient Egypt's Old Kingdom era
ICAO code for Severo-Eniseysk Airport

See also
Uni (disambiguation)